Rosalino "Chalino" Sánchez Félix (30 August 1960 – 16 May 1992), was a Mexican singer-songwriter. Posthumously called "El Rey del Corrido", he is widely considered one of the most influential narcocorrido singers of the late 20th century. Chalino was an initial pioneer in Mexican music. Chalino began composing songs for inmates that had stories they wanted to preserve in a ballad. Chalino also composed and sang romantic and radio-friendly songs. 

Sánchez was born in Sinaloa to Santos Sánchez and Sannorina Félix. The youngest of the Sánchez family, Rosalino had aspirations of musical notoriety from a young age. In 1984, Armando, Chalino's brother, was murdered in a hotel in Tijuana, inspiring him to compose his first corrido Recordando A Armando Sánchez. Eventually, Chalino began to profit via his compositions and would often be gifted with guns and 'presents' by his customers. Prior to his brothers' murder, Chalino was introduced to Ángel Parra, who became interested in his musical talents after hearing a performance. Ángel Parra arranged for Chalino to have a meeting at his studio Angel Studios and began recording his first demo cassette with a norteño group named Los Cuatro de la Frontera. By 1989, Sánchez was recognized throughout California and received many requests to sing in various music venues.

Chalino performed in various venues in California, such as the El Parral Nightclub in South Gate, California, El Puma De Sinaloa, and El Farallón. He also performed at the Keystone Ford Show and Noches de Taconazo. Around this time, he formed Los Amables del Norte, arguably producing his most acclaimed music while associated with them. He signed with numerous record labels, such as Discos Linda, Cintas Acuario, RR, Balboa Records Edimusa, and Musart. It was during the early 1990s that Sánchez received the nickname "Rey de Los Corridos" (King of the Corridos) and was regarded as one of Mexico's greatest singers. On January 25, 1992, Sánchez was attacked by Eduardo Gallegos (32) while performing at the Plaza Los Arcos restaurant and nightclub. Sánchez was shot twice near his armpit, striking his lung, ensuing a gunfight. Chalino initially missed Gallegos and accidentally struck 20-year-old Claudio Rene Carranza in the right leg striking the main artery, later killing him. The shooting made headlines in regional English-language newspapers and ABC World News Tonight. After the shooting, Chalino saw success with his sales and began getting airplay.

Rosalino was shot and killed on May 16, 1992, by unidentified assailants, presumably hours after a performance at the Salon Bugambilias in Culiacán.

Early life
Rosalino Sánchez Félix was born on "Las Flechas", a small ranch in Sinaloa. He was the youngest of seven children. His parents were Santos Sanchez (?–1964) and Senorina Felix (?–1991). Chalino grew up poor and lived a difficult life. His sister, Juana, called him a curious and mischievous child who always dreamed about becoming a singer. His birth name was Rosalino, but he preferred his nickname Chalino since Rosalino sounded too feminine for Sanchez.

In 1975 when he was 15, his sister was raped. Two years later in 1977, a 17-year-old Chalino saw the man at a party and allegedly shot him in revenge, killing him. After committing this act, Sanchez left for Tijuana with his gun and a Jesús Malverde chain. During his time in Tijuana, he worked as a "coyote" (an immigrant smuggler), taking immigrants into the United States.

The same year, Chalino himself crossed into the United States as an undocumented migrant worker. He began in Oregon and later moved to Los Angeles to live with his aunt in Inglewood, California. He washed dishes, sold cars, and, according to his friends, dealt small quantities of marijuana and cocaine. He also helped his older brother, Armando, run an immigrant-smuggling operation.

Chalino met Marisela Vallejos through his cousin, Rosalba; in 1984 they married in a simple and intimate wedding. They married with their son, Adán Sánchez, on the way and had a second child, Cynthia Sanchez. They were married until Chalino Sanchez's death in 1992.

In 1984, Armando was shot and killed in a hotel in Tijuana, which inspired Chalino to compose his first corrido or ballad. Around this time, Chalino was arrested. He began composing songs for his fellow inmates and anyone with a story worth telling. Chalino began to earn money through his compositions and would be gifted with guns and 'presents' by his customers. Among his many customers were Lucio Villareal, El Pelavacas, and Jorge "El Coquio" Castro. A small group known as "Los Cuatro de la Frontera" recommended Chalino go to a recording studio in Olympic Boulevard in Los Angeles. The studio was called San Angel Records and was owned by Angel Mariscal. Originally another artist was meant to sing Chalino's songs, but he canceled, so Chalino sang his own songs.

In 1989, Chalino recorded his first cassette of 15 songs. While selling his cassettes out of his car trunk, Chalino stocked tapes at local swapmeets, bakeries, and various other businesses across South Central Los Angeles. Chalino connected with another Mexican immigrant, Pedro Rivera, who had set up a small recording studio in Long Beach, California. Called Cintas Acuario, this studio allowed aspiring musicians to record for cheap.

Chalino and Rivera pioneered the "prohibited corridos" (corrido prohibido), songs that mythologized drug smugglers, murderers, or "valientes". The Cintas Acuario roster (which later included Pedro’s children, Lupillo, Juan, and the late Jenni Rivera) was not initially aired on radio, but they became the foundation of the Latino genre in Los Angeles.

Promoters across the Southland quickly sought to book Chalino at their clubs. Chalino sang his songs in his cadence and Sinaoloan slang, something no big singer had ever tried to do.

1992 Coachella incident 

On 25 January 1992, Chalino was performing at the Plaza Los Arcos restaurant and nightclub in the desert city of Coachella, 120 miles east of Los Angeles. Reportedly Chalino was set to perform at 10 pm on the main stage. At around 7 pm, the event center was at maximum capacity as 400 people were in attendance.

During his performance, Chalino began taking song requests from the audience. Shortly before midnight, Eduardo Gallegos, 32, a local unemployed mechanic from Thermal, California, under the influence of heroin and alcohol, requested "El Gallo de Sinaloa". Immediately afterwards, Gallegos jumped up on stage and pointed a .25 caliber pistol at Chalino. In retaliation, Chalino pulled his 10 mm pistol from his waistband and began a gun battle.

Gallegos' first four shots hit Chalino twice in the chest near his armpit striking his lung, and one bullet hit accordionist Ignacio "Nacho" Hernandez in the thigh. Chalino's shots missed Gallegos and accidentally struck 20-year-old Claudio Rene Carranza in the right leg hitting the main artery. He was later pronounced dead at John F. Kennedy Memorial Hospital. Sanchez and Gallegos opened fire at each other while ensuing in a brief chase into the crowd below. Nine to fifteen shots were fired and around seven more people were reportedly hit in the exchange as well. Gallegos was wrestled to the floor by a bystander until Gallegos was eventually shot in the face with his own pistol. Gallegos and Sanchez were both listed as critical and both transported to Desert Regional Hospital, in Palm Springs.

Chalino Sanchez, was in the Hospital for 11 days and was released home without any charges due to a self-defense claim.

Eduardo Gallegos, who survived his wounds, was convicted of attempted murder and was sentenced to 15 years to life in prison.

The shooting made ABC World News Tonight as well as both English- and Spanish-language newspapers. Chalino saw success with his sales and began getting airplay, although it was a single, old-fashioned, non-narco song called “Nieves de Enero”. For his next Los Angeles appearance at El Parral, doors had to close at 6 pm, 5–6 hours before he was due on stage.

Murder
On 15 May 1992, four months after the Coachella incident and during a performance at the Salon Bugambilias in Culiacán, Chalino was handed a note from someone in the crowd. The note is believed to have been a death threat. A video recording of the song "Alma Enamorada" shows Chalino crumpling up the note before singing the song. After midnight, Chalino drove away from the club with two of his brothers, a cousin, and several young women. They were pulled over by a group of armed men in black Chevrolet Suburbans. They showed state police ID cards and told Chalino their commandant wanted to see him. Chalino agreed and got into one of their cars while the others followed behind.

The following day, at six in the morning, two farmers found Chalino's body by an irrigation canal near Highway 15, near the neighborhood of Los Laureles, Culiacán. He was blindfolded and his wrists had rope marks. He had been shot in the back of the head twice.

Legacy and family
Chalino's son Adán Sánchez followed his father's footsteps and was also a successful Regional Mexican singer; he passed away suddenly due to injuries sustained in a car accident at the age of 19.

Since his death, his fame and recordings have grown in popularity. Chalino still amasses millions of streams three decades after his death and remains popular with young Hispanic listeners.

Select discography

1988 Chuyita Beltran
1988 Dos Cruces Negras
1988 Que Me Entierren Cantando
1988 Mas Exitos Con Chalino Sanchez
1988 El Gallo de Sinaloa
1988 Chalino Sanchez y Los Amables del Norte
1989 El Bandido Generoso
1989 A Todo Sinaloa
1989 El Pela Vacas
1989 Chalino Sánchez Con Los Amables Del Norte
1989 Chalino Sánchez Con Banda La Costeña “Corridos Y Canciones”
1989 Más Éxitos Con Chalino Sánchez
1989 17 Exitos
1990 Homenaje a Pollero
1990 13 Mejores Exitos
1991 Nieves De Enero Con Los Amables Del Norte
1991 Chalino Sánchez Con La Banda La Costeña De Ramón L. Alvarado
1991 Alma Enamorada
1991 El Pavido Navido
1992  Adios a Chalino

References

Quinones, Sam. (2001). True Tales from Another Mexico: The Lynch Mob, the Popsicle King, Chalino and the Bronx University of New Mexico Press www.samquinones.com

Mexican emigrants to the United States
Mexican male singer-songwriters
1992 deaths
People murdered in Mexico
Deaths by firearm in Mexico
Mexican murder victims
Singers from Sinaloa
People from Culiacán Municipality
Norteño musicians
1960 births
20th-century Mexican male singers